= Gene R. Gravelle =

American politician

Member of the New Hampshire House of Representatives from the Hillsborough 14th district
- In office 1974–1976

Personal details
- Party: Democratic

Gene R. Gravelle is an American politician. He served as a Democratic member for the Hillsborough 14th district of the New Hampshire House of Representatives.

== Life and career ==
Gravelle was an insurance underwriter.

Gravelle served in the New Hampshire House of Representatives from 1974 to 1976.
